Michael Joseph may refer to:

Michael An Gof (Michael Joseph, died 1497), Cornish rebel
Michael Joseph (publisher) (1897–1958), British publisher and writer
M. K. Joseph (Michael Kennedy Joseph, 1914–1981), New Zealand novelist
Michael Joseph (athlete) (born 1971), Belizean Olympic sprinter
Michael Joseph (businessman), Kenyan-American business executive
Michael Joseph (sailor) (born 1973), Caymanian sailor

See also

Michael Josephs, composer